The men's light heavyweight event was part of the boxing programme at the 1960 Summer Olympics. The weight class allowed boxers of up to 81 kilograms to compete. The competition was held from 26 August to 5 September 1960. 19 boxers from 19 nations competed.

Competition format

The competition was a straight single-elimination tournament, with no bronze medal match (two bronze medals were awarded, one to each semifinal loser).

Schedule

Results

Top half

Bottom half

Finals

References

Light Heavyweight